National Movement of Amhara (NaMA) is a right-wing Amhara ethnic nationalist  political party created in June 2018 in Bahir Dar, capital of the Amhara Region of Ethiopia.

Creation
NAMA was created in June 2018 in Bahir Dar to defend the interests of Amhara people in Ethiopia, after Abiy Ahmed became prime minister of Ethiopia and promised the "broadening [of] democratic space".

Leadership and structure
Desalagne Chanie (or Chane) was elected as the chair of NaMA at its creation in June 2018. He was replaced by Belete Molla, who was elected as chair in February 2020 in a meeting that included observers from the National Election Board of Ethiopia (NEBE).

, NaMA was led by a nine-member executive committee, including Belete as chair. One of the executive committee members, Christian Tadele, was at the time under arrest as a suspect in the Amhara Region coup d'état attempt of June 2019.

Political positions

June 2019 Amhara Region coup d'état attempt
In December 2019, NaMA called for the release of its leaders who had been arrested for suspicion of involvement in the June 2019 Amhara Region coup d'état attempt. NaMA stated that the detainees had not been interrogated in relation to the killings that occurred during the attempted coup d'état. NaMA stated that it wants "the real culprits" of the event to be "held accountable".

Massacres
In October 2020, NaMA criticised the federal government for killings of ethnic Amharas in Oromia Region, Benishangul-Gumuz Region and Southern Nations, Nationalities, and Peoples' Region. NaMA accused the federal government of "demeaning the attacks, hiding evidence and in frequent cases blaming the victims" and regional government officials of failing to stop the attacks and of supporting the perpetrators.

References

Ethnic political parties in Ethiopia
Political parties in Ethiopia